The 2006-07 Cupa României was the 4th annual Romanian women's football knockout tournaments.

Semifinals

Final

References

Rom
Fem
Rom
Women's sport in Romania